Sadeyreh-ye Olya (also Romanized as Sadeyreh-ye ‘Olyā; also known as Şaveyreh, Şoveyreh, Surin, and Sweira) is a village in Jarahi Rural District, in the Central District of Mahshahr County, Khuzestan Province, Iran. At the 2006 census, its population was 99, in 21 families.

References 

Populated places in Mahshahr County